Survival of the Fittest, the 13th novel by Jonathan Kellerman, is told through the first-person point of view of Kellerman's main character, Dr. Alex Delaware.  LAPD Detective Milo Sturgis has asked Alex to help him with another whodunit. It reached number two in the New York Times Best Seller List for paperbacks.

Plot introduction
The plot centers around the murder of the daughter of an Israeli diplomat.  The murder seems exceptionally cruel, since the girl was developmentally disabled.  From the positioning of the body and location, motive for the killing is not clear, until other people with other disabilities, such as being blind, having a very low IQ, etc., are killed, and strange symbols are showing up at the scenes.  Only when they learn of a very cruel, self-righteous conspiracy to practice eugenics do Milo and Alex start unravelling this very dark case.

References

1997 American novels
Novels by Jonathan Kellerman
Fictional portrayals of the Los Angeles Police Department